"Darkness Within" is a single by American heavy metal band Machine Head. The track is taken from the 2011 album Unto the Locust. It peaked at No. 35 on the Billboard Mainstream Rock chart, the band's first entry on the chart and highest position on the chart.

Track listing

Music video
The video for "Darkness Within" was filmed in Prague, Czech Republic.

Machine Head guitarist/vocalist Robb Flynn spoke about the making of the song:

Personnel
Robb Flynn – lead vocals, rhythm guitar, acoustic guitar
Adam Duce – bass, backing vocals
Dave McClain – drums
Phil Demmel – lead guitar

References

Machine Head (band) songs
2011 songs
Songs written by Robb Flynn
Roadrunner Records singles
Songs written by Dave McClain (drummer)
Songs written by Phil Demmel